Mount Armstrong is a mountain, 2,330 m, standing 5 nautical miles (9 km) south-southeast of Mount Goodale in the Hays Mountains. Mapped by United States Geological Survey (USGS) from ground surveys and U.S. Navy air photos, 1960–64. Named by Advisory Committee on Antarctic Names (US-ACAN) for Thomas B. Armstrong, United States Antarctic Research Program (USARP) representative at Palmer Station, summer 1966–67.

References

Mountains of the Ross Dependency